Chilas is a city and is the divisional capital of Diamer District located in Gilgit-Baltistan, Pakistan, on the Indus River. It is part of the Silk Road, connected by the Karakoram Highway and N-90 National Highway to Islamabad and Peshawar in the southwest, via Hazara and Malakand divisions of Khyber Pakhtunkhwa. To the north, Chilas connects to the cities of Tashkurgan and Kashgar in Xinjiang, via Gilgit, Aliabad, Sust, and the Khunjerab Pass.

Chilas comes under Gilgit-Baltistan. It is the headquarters of Diamir district. The weather is hot and dry in the summer and dry and cold in the winter. It can be reached by the Karakoram highway and also through
the Kaghan valley and the Babusar Pass. Chilas is on the left bank of the Indus River. The beautiful Fairy Meadows National Park and Nanga Parbat, the ninth highest peak in the world, are also located in Chilas.

Karakoram International University recently opened a sub-campus in Chilas.

History
Even after Kashmiri-British rule was imposed a century ago, the Indus Valley west of Chilas was a hornet’s nest of tiny republics; there was one in almost every side valley, each loosely guided by a jirga (council of tribal elders) but effectively leaderless, all at war with one another and feuding internally. Though administratively lumped with Gilgit, Chilas and its neighbours are temperamentally more like Indus Kohistani people, probably  due to a similarly hostile environment and the same Sunni Muslim orthodoxy. Their ancestors were converted to Islam by a Sufi Muslim, from the Kaghan valley. Syed Noor Shah, known as Ghazi Baba, was the first man to preach Islam in Thak, and built the first mosque, which is still there. Ghazi Baba belonged to the Syed family of Kaghan. In Tangir and Darel, Islam came from the direction of Swat direction. whereas hardly anyone north of Chilas in the Gilgit-Baltistan province is Sunni. 
 
Chilas Fort was first garrisoned to protect British supply lines over the Babusar Pass, and beefed up after local tribes nearly overran it in 1893. Now a police post, it has put a lid on Chilas, though not on the Darel and Tangir Valleys to the west.
 
The Chilasis are Shina speakers, with some Pashtun settlers speaking Pashto. Urdu and some English are also spoken.

Climate
Chilas has a cold semi-arid climate (Köppen: BSk).

Ancient petroglyphs

More than 50,000 Buddhist petroglyphs and inscriptions line the Karakoram Highway in Gilgit-Baltistan, Pakistan. They are concentrated at ten major sites between Hunza and Shatial, but more have been found near Skardu and Shigar, where  and Thewalt found the remains of a Buddhist monastery in 1984. The carvings were left by various invaders, traders and pilgrims who passed along the trade route, as well as by locals. The earliest date back to between 5000 and 1000 BC, showing single animals, triangular men and hunting scenes in which the animals sometimes are larger than the hunters. These carvings were pecked into the rocks with stone tools and are covered with a thick patina that proves their age. Later — mostly Buddhist — carvings were sometimes executed with a sharp chisel.

Jettmar tried to piece together the history of the area from various inscriptions and recorded his findings in "Rockcarvings and Inscriptions in the Northern Areas of Pakistan" and the later "Between Gandhara and the Silk Roads: Rock carvings along the Karakoram Highway".

The Kharoshthi term "Kaboa" (or Kamboa) appears in a short commemorative Kharosthi inscription found from Chilas as reported by the Archaeological Department of Pakistan. The inscription has been transcribed, translated and interpreted by Ahmad Hasan Dani, a Pakistani archaeologist, historian, and linguist, who was among the foremost authorities on South Asian archaeology and history. According to Dani, Kaboa or Kamboa of the inscription is a Kharoshthised form of Sanskrit Kamboja. Thus, it seems likely that Chilas also formed part of an ancient Kamboja kingdom.

Notable persons 
 Muhammad Bilal Khan, journalist (1997 - 2019)

 Hussain Ahmad Journalist
1995 -

See also

Parri Bangla
Chilas Airport

Notes

References
 Jettmar, Karl & Thewalt, Volker (1985): Zwischen Gandhāra und den Seidenstraßen: Felsbilder am Karakorum Highway: Entdeckungen deutsch-pakistanischer Expeditionen 1979-1984. 1985. Mainz am Rhein, Philipp von Zabern.
 Jettmar, Karl (1980): Bolor & Dardistan. Karl Jettmar. Islamabad, National Institute of Folk Heritage.
 Leitner, G. W. (1893): Dardistan in 1866, 1886 and 1893: Being An Account of the History, Religions, Customs, Legends, Fables and Songs of Gilgit, Chilas, Kandia (Gabrial) Yasin, Chitral, Hunza, Nagyr and other parts of the Hindukush, as also a supplement to the second edition of The Hunza and Nagyr Handbook. And An Epitome of Part III of the author's "The Languages and Races of Dardistan." First Reprint 1978. Manjusri Publishing House, New Delhi.
 Rod MacNeil:  The Fight at Chilas (1893).  Soldiers of the Queen (journal of the Victorian Military Society). March 1999.

External links
 Mountains on Webshots.com

Populated places along the Silk Road
Populated places in Diamer District
Cities in Pakistan